"Tout va bien" is a song by French artists Alonzo, Ninho and Naps released in May 2022. The song peaked at number one on the French Singles Chart.

Charts

References

2022 songs
2022 singles
SNEP Top Singles number-one singles
French-language songs